was a town located in Nogi District, Shimane Prefecture, Japan.

As of 2003, the town had an estimated population of 5,330 and a density of 55.60 persons per km2. The total area was 95.87 km2.

On October 1, 2004, Hakuta, along with the town of Hirose (also from Nogi District), was merged into the expanded city of Yasugi.

Dissolved municipalities of Shimane Prefecture